Year's Best SF 9 is a science fiction anthology edited by David G. Hartwell and Kathryn Cramer that was published in 2004.  It is the ninth in the Year's Best SF series.

Contents

The book itself, as well as each of the stories, has a short
introduction by the editors.

Octavia E. Butler: "Amnesty" (Originally in Sci Fiction, 2003)
Geoff Ryman: "Birth Days" (Originally in Interzone, 2003)
Tony Ballantyne: "The Waters of Meribah" (Originally in Interzone, 2003)
Nancy Kress: "Ej-Es" (Originally in Stars: Original Stories Based on the Songs of Janis Ian, 2003)
Joe Haldeman: "Four Short Novels" (Originally in F&SF, 2003)
Charles Stross: "Rogue Farm" (Originally in Live Without a Net, 2003)
Angélica Gorodischer: "The Violet's Embryos" (Originally in Cosmos Latinos, 2003)
Michael Swanwick: "Coyote at the End of History" (Originally in Asimov's, 2003)
John Varley: "In Fading Suns and Dying Moons" (Originally in Stars: Original Stories Based on the Songs of Janis Ian, 2003)
Gene Wolfe: "Castaway" (Originally in Sci Fiction, 2003)
Gregory Benford: "The Hydrogen Wall" (Originally in Asimov's, 2003)
 Ricard de la Casa and Pedro Jorge Romero: "The Day We Went Through the Transition" (Originally in Cosmos Latinos, 2003)
Cory Doctorow: "Nimby and the Dimension Hoppers" (Originally in Asimov's, 2003)
Robert Reed: "Night of Time" (Originally in The Silver Gryphon, 2003)
Kage Baker: "A Night on the Barbary Coast" (Originally in The Silver Gryphon, 2003)
 Nigel Brown: "Annuity Clinic" (Originally in Interzone, 2003)
Allen M. Steele: "The Madwoman of Shuttlefield" (Originally in Asimov's, 2003)
M. Rickert: "Bread and Bombs" (Originally in F&SF, 2003)
Stephen Baxter: "The Great Game" (Originally in Asimov's, 2003)
Rick Moody: "The Albertine Notes" (Originally in McSweeney's Mammoth Treasury of Thrilling Tales, 2003)

External links 

2004 anthologies
Year's Best SF anthology series
Eos Books books
2000s science fiction works